Jarbas Barbosa da Silva Jr. is a public health expert from Brazil who as elected to serve as the Director of the Pan American Health Organization (PAHO) and Regional Director for the Americas of the World Health Organization (WHO) from 2023. He was elected to replace Carissa Etienne of Dominica, who is currently in charge of PAHO since 2013.

References

Living people
Brazil officials of the United Nations
World Health Organization officials
Year of birth missing (living people)